Ravrambha is an upcoming Indian Marathi-language Historical romance film directed by Anup Ashok Jagdale and produced by Shashikant Pawar. It is based on the story of Ravrambha Nimbalkar, a warrior of the Maratha Empire. Ravrambha is scheduled to be theatrically released on 12 May 2023.

Cast 

 Monalisa Bagal
 Om Bhutkar
 Ashok Samarth as Prataprao Gujar
 Shantanu Moghe as Chatrapati Shivaji Maharaj
 Apurva Nemlekar
 Kiran Mane
 Girish Kulkarni

Production

Development 
The film is produced by Shashikant Pawar under the banner of Shashikant Pawar Productions. It is marked to be Anup Jagdale's first historical film. Initially film was set to be theatrically released on 7 April 2023, but later it was pushed to 12 May 2023.

Filming 

Pre-production of the film started in 2022 in Ajinkyatara of Satara district.

Release

Theatrical 
The film is scheduled to be theatrically released on 12 May 2023.

References

External links 

 
2023 films
Indian historical films
Cultural depictions of Shivaji
Films set in the Maratha Empire
2020s Marathi-language films
Action films based on actual events
Indian historical drama films
2020s historical drama films
Films set in the 1670s